Jackson County is a county located in the U.S. state of Wisconsin. As of the 2020 census, the population was 21,145. Its county seat is Black River Falls. Jackson County was formed from Crawford County in 1853. It was named for President Andrew Jackson.

Geography

Adjacent counties
 Clark County - north
 Wood County - east
 Juneau County - southeast
 Monroe County - south
 La Crosse County - southwest
 Trempealeau County - west
 Eau Claire County - northwest

Major highways

Railroads
Canadian National
Union Pacific

Buses
List of intercity bus stops in Wisconsin

Demographics

2020 census
As of the census of 2020, the population was 21,145. The racial makeup of the county was 85.8% White, 6.5% Native American, 2.1% Black or African American, 0.4% Asian, 1.2% from other races, and 4.1% from two or more races. Ethnically, the population was 3.2% Hispanic or Latino of any race.

2000 census

As of the census of 2000, there were 19,100 people, 7,070 households, and 4,835 families residing in the county. The population density was 19 people per square mile (7/km2). There were 8,029 housing units at an average density of 8 per square mile (3/km2). The racial makeup of the county was 89.58% White, 2.27% Black or African American, 6.16% Native American, 0.16% Asian, 0.04% Pacific Islander, 1.01% from other races, and 0.79% from two or more races. 1.87% of the population were Hispanic or Latino of any race. 31.4% were of German, 30.2% Norwegian and 5.2% Irish ancestry. 94.7% spoke English, 2.2% Spanish and 1.5% Winnebago as their first language.

There were 7,070 households, out of which 31.00% had children under the age of 18 living with them, 55.40% were married couples living together, 8.60% had a female householder with no husband present, and 31.60% were non-families. 26.20% of all households were made up of individuals, and 11.80% had someone living alone who was 65 years of age or older. The average household size was 2.49 and the average family size was 3.00.

In the county, the population was spread out, with 24.10% under the age of 18, 8.80% from 18 to 24, 29.40% from 25 to 44, 22.80% from 45 to 64, and 14.90% who were 65 years of age or older. The median age was 38 years. For every 100 females there were 114.60 males. For every 100 females age 18 and over, there were 116.30 males.

In 2017, there were 227 births, giving a general fertility rate of 74.0 births per 1000 women aged 15–44, the 10th highest rate out of all 72 Wisconsin counties. Of these, 14 of the births occurred at home. Additionally, there were 7 reported induced abortions performed on women of Jackson County residence in 2017.

Communities

City
 Black River Falls (county seat)

Villages
 Alma Center
 Hixton
 Melrose
 Merrillan
 Taylor

Towns

 Adams
 Albion
 Alma
 Bear Bluff
 Brockway
 City Point
 Cleveland
 Curran
 Franklin
 Garden Valley
 Garfield
 Hixton
 Irving
 Knapp
 Komensky
 Manchester
 Melrose
 Millston
 North Bend
 Northfield
 Springfield

Census-designated places
 Hatfield
 Millston
 Mission
 Sand Pillow

Other unincorporated communities

 Brockway
 Buckholz Corners
 City Point
 Disco
 Fall Hall Glen
 Franklin
 Irving
 Levis
 North Bend
 North Branch
 Northfield
 Pray
 Price
 Requa
 Sechlerville
 Shamrock
 Spaulding
 Speck Oaks
 Vaudreuil
 Waterbury
 Winnebago Mission
 York

Ghost towns/neighborhoods
 Charter Oak Mills
 Clay
 Rogneys
 Wrightsville

Politics

Economy
The county's largest employer is the Ho-Chunk Nation, which employs roughly 3100 people combined in Jackson and Sauk counties.

See also
 National Register of Historic Places listings in Jackson County, Wisconsin

References

Further reading
 Biographical History of Clark and Jackson Counties, Wisconsin. Chicago: Lewis Publishing Co., 1891.

External links
 Jackson County
 Jackson County map from the Wisconsin Department of Transportation
 Jackson County Health and Demographic Data

 
1853 establishments in Wisconsin
Populated places established in 1853